Nanbu Bijin Brewery (also known as Kuji Shuzo) is located in Ninohe City in Japan.

History
In 1902, Nanbu Bijin Brewery was first established as only a sake retailer. Then, in 1915,  it was licensed to brew sake. Its name comes from a combination of words: nanbu stands for the region, and bijin for beautiful woman. The current tōji (Kanji: 杜氏 Hiragana: とうじ), or master sake brewer, is Hajime Yamaguchi. In 1992, Hajime was selected by the Ministry of Labor as one of the 100 Great Craftsmen.

Currently, Kuramoto Kuji Hideo and his son, Kuji Kosuke, are active in the business and employ about 25 people. Kuji Kosuke is slated to be the 7th generation of the Kuramoto family.

Kuji Kosuke
Kuji Kosuke was born May 11, 1972. He graduated from Tokyo University of Agriculture's Department of Brewing and Fermentation. In 2005, he received the Iwate Prefecture Young Distinguished Technician Award. In 2006, he became a member of the board of trustees of Fukuoka High School.

Positions of Public Service
Chairperson, Cassiopeia Corporation Youth Conference
School Board Member, Fukuoka High School, Iwate Prefecture
Vice-Chairman, Technology Committee, Iwate Prefecture Brewers and Distillers’ Association

In popular culture
In the movie, Kampai! For the Love of Sake, the brewery is discussed.

References

External links
 

Sake
Breweries
Food and drink companies of Japan
Drink companies of Japan